Johanan ben Aaron ben Nathanael Luria was an Alsatian Talmudist. He lived successively at Niedernheim and Strasburg at the end of the fifteenth century and in the beginning of the sixteenth. After having studied for many years in German yeshivot, he returned to Alsace and settled in Strasburg, where he founded a yeshiva by permission of the government. Luria was the author of an ethical work entitled "Hadrakah" (Cracow, c. 1579) and of "Meshibat Nefesh" (Neubauer, "Catalogue of the Hebrew MSS. in the Bodleian Library" No. 257), an aggadic and mystical commentary on the Pentateuch, founded on Rashi. To this commentary was appended a dissertation in which Luria refuted the arguments advanced by Christians against Judaism.

One of his descendants was Elijah Loans.

References 

15th-century German rabbis
16th-century German rabbis
Alsatian Jews
Bible commentators
Kabbalists
Clergy from Strasbourg
Place of birth unknown
Place of death unknown
Rosh yeshivas
Year of birth unknown
Year of death unknown
Talmudists